Wig Wam is a Norwegian glam metal band formed in Halden in 2001. Wig Wam's lineup—consisting of vocalist Glam (Åge Sten Nilsen), guitarist Teeny (Trond Holter), bassist Flash (Bernt Jansen) and drummer Sporty (Øystein Andersen)—has remained unchanged since the band's formation. The band's style mixes glam metal and hard rock with humorous lyrics and imagery. The band had their international breakthrough in 2005 when they  in the Eurovision Song Contest held in Kyiv and placed ninth with the song "In My Dreams". Wig Wam split up in 2014, but reunited in 2019. The band enjoyed further fame in 2022 when James Gunn chose their song "Do Ya Wanna Taste It" as the opening theme for the HBO Max show Peacemaker. "In My Dreams" was also featured in the Peacemaker soundtrack. Wig Wam has released five studio albums. The band's slogan is: "Rock is the new schläger".

History 
Wig Wam was formed in 2001 by musicians active in bands such as Dream Police, Artch, Sha-Boom, Ole Evenrud and Alien. Among their primary influences and musical idols are Kiss and Sweet. The band started their career by touring Norway with numerous live performances and quickly became one of the country's most popular live bands. Their fan base would later be known as Wig Wamaniacs. In 2004 the band released their debut album 667.. The Neighbour of the Beast.

A year later they represented Norway in the Eurovision Song Contest 2005 with the song "In My Dreams" and placed ninth. The song would go on to become a successful hit in Norway, peaking for three weeks at the top of the national single chart, an achievement neither of Norway's two previous Eurovision winners had managed, and also enjoyed commercial success in Scandinavia. Following Eurovision, Wig Wam toured extensively in Europe. The band had previously placed third in the Norwegian Eurovision final in 2004 with the song "Crazy Things" and singer Glam had also placed third in 1998 when he entered under his former artist name G'sten with the song "Always Will". The band released their second studio album Wig Wamania in 2006 and the live album Live in Tokyo in 2007. The band released their third studio album Non Stop Rock'n Roll in 2010 and opened for KISS at Valhall in Oslo on 14 June 2010. Wig Wam's fourth studio album Wall Street was released in 2012. In 2014 the band announced that the members would part ways after thirteen years together. Wig Wam reunited in 2019 and released their fifth studio album Never Say Die in 2021.

In January 2022, HBO Max released the television series Peacemaker which features the band's song "Do Ya Wanna Taste It" as its opening theme and also includes "In My Dreams" on the soundtrack. While they had been dropped by their booking agency shortly before the opening sequence was revealed, it proved popular enough to lead to a career resurgence for the band.

Band members 

 Glam (Åge Sten Nilsen) — vocals
 Teeny (Trond Holter) — guitar
 Flash (Bernt Jansen) — bass guitar
 Sporty (Øystein Andersen) — drums
Lasse Finbråten — keyboards (live)

Discography 

Studio albums
667.. The Neighbour of the Beast / Hard to Be a Rock'n Roller (2004)
Wig Wamania (2006)
Non Stop Rock'n Roll (2010)
Wall Street (2012)
Never Say Die (2021)
Out of the Dark (2023)

References

External links 

Official website
Wig Wam at AllMusic

2001 establishments in Norway
Eurovision Song Contest entrants of 2005
Melodi Grand Prix contestants
Melodi Grand Prix winners
Musical groups established in 2001
Musical groups from Halden
Eurovision Song Contest entrants for Norway
Norwegian glam rock musical groups
Norwegian glam metal musical groups
Norwegian hard rock musical groups
Norwegian heavy metal musical groups
Norwegian rock music groups